Sir John Prise (also Prys, Price, in Welsh Syr Siôn ap Rhys) (1501/2–1555) was a Welsh public notary, who acted as a royal agent and visitor of the monasteries. He was also a scholar, associated with the first Welsh printed publication Yn y lhyvyr hwnn.  He was a Member (MP) of the Parliament of England for Breconshire in 1547; Hereford October 1553; Ludlow April 1554; and Ludgershall November 1554.

Life
He was son of Rhys ab Gwilym by Gwenllian, daughter of Howel Madoc. He was educated at All Souls College, Oxford, and became a notary public and receiver of the king. From a statement of Rowland Lee, it appears that Prise had been some time in the service of the Earl of Arundel as constable of Cloon Castle in  Ireland, and that for his employment he was promoted to be one of Thomas Cromwell's agents.

In May 1532, when the Earls of Westmorland and Cumberland and Sir Thomas Clifford searched Cuthbert Tunstall's house at Bishop Auckland, Price looked into the manuscripts, and made a report to Cromwell. In 1533 he was employed under Cromwell. In 1534 he was registrar of Salisbury Cathedral. In April 1535 he took part in the proceedings against the Carthusians as to the royal supremacy. He officiated in the same way at the trial of John Fisher and Thomas More. He took part in the major visitation of the monasteries of 1535, alongside Sir Thomas Legh. When the Pilgrimage of Grace was quelled, he assisted in trying the rebels. For his services he received in 1537–38 a joint lease of Carmarthen rectory, and a lease of Brecon Priory and rectory. He also bought the priory of St. Guthlac, Hereford. In a petition of 1538 he asked for the manor of West Dereham.

He took part in public affairs, for example in the union of England and Wales, drafting or suggesting the petition on which the statutes were framed. He was Sheriff of Breconshire in 1541, and lived chiefly at Brecon Priory. He was knighted on 22 February 1547, served as knight of the shire for Breconshire in 1547, and made one of the council for the Welsh marches in 1551.

He and his son Richard were patrons of Hugh Evans, and are said to have introduced him to Shakespeare; Richard gave Evans the living of Merthyr Cynog, Brecon, in 1572. Evans died in 1581, and made Richard Price the overseer of his will. He married Joan, daughter of John Williams of Southwark, and had a family of five sons and two daughters.

Works
Prise was encouraged as a scholar by William Herbert, 1st Earl of Pembroke, and became a collector of manuscripts. He wrote:
 Historiae Britannicae Defensio, composed about 1553, published by his son Richard in 1573, and dedicated to Lord Burghley; in part a protest against Polydore Vergil. It defended the traditional historical accounts of Brutus of Troy and King Arthur in early British history.
 Description of Cambria, translated and enlarged by Humphrey Lhuyd, and published as part of the Historie of Cambria by David Powel, 1584; other editions 1697, 1702, 1774, and 1812. 
 Fides Historian Britannicae, a correction of Polydore Vergil (Brit. Mus. Cotton MS. Titus, F. iii. 17). 
 A tract on the restitution of the coinage, written in 1553; dedicated to Queen Mary (MS. New Coll. Oxon. Arch. MS. 317, iii.); in this tract he refers to a larger treatise on the same subject, which is not extant.

He is also said to have translated and published the Lord's Prayer, Creed, and Ten Commandments in Welsh, for the first time, in Yn y lhyvyr hwnn (1546).

Modern editions

References

History of Parliament-Breconshire

Further reading

Ceri Davies,Two Welsh Renaissance Latinists: Sir John Prise of Brecon and Dr John Davies of Mallwyd. In Burnett, Charles S. F.; Mann, Nicholas (ed.), Britannia Latina : Latin in the culture of Great Britain from the Middle Ages to the twentieth century (2005).

1502 births
1555 deaths
Welsh lawyers
Welsh writers
People associated with the Dissolution of the Monasteries
16th-century Welsh writers
16th-century male writers
High Sheriffs of Brecknockshire
Members of the Parliament of England (pre-1707) for constituencies in Wales
English MPs 1547–1552
English MPs 1554
English MPs 1553 (Mary I)
English MPs 1554–1555
Knights Bachelor